Philipsburg may refer to:

Philipsburg, Montana, United States
Philipsburg, Pennsylvania (disambiguation), several places in Pennsylvania, United States
Philipsburg, Quebec, a lakeside village in Quebec on the Canada-United States border
Philipsburg, Sint Maarten, the capital of Sint Maarten
Philipsburg Manor, a large Colonial era estate in Westchester County, New York
Philipsburg, New York, also "Philipsburgh, original name for Sleepy Hollow, New York

See also
Philippsburg (disambiguation)
Phillipsburg (disambiguation)